Malta Township is one of nineteen townships in DeKalb County, Illinois, USA.  As of the 2010 census, its population was 1,608 and it contained 640 housing units. Malta Township was originally formed as Etna Township from a portion of DeKalb Township in September, 1856; it was renamed to Malta Township in December 1858. Kishwaukee College is in this township.

Geography

Cities, towns, villages
 Malta

Cemeteries
 Hudson
 Malta

Airports and landing strips
 Hendrickson Flying Service Airport

Lakes
 Harkness Lake

Demographics

School districts
 DeKalb Community Unit School District 428
 Indian Creek Community Unit District 425

Political districts
 Illinois's 16th congressional district
 State House District 70
 State Senate District 35

References
 
 US Census Bureau 2009 TIGER/Line Shapefiles
 US National Atlas

External links
 City-Data.com
 Illinois State Archives
 Township Officials of Illinois
 DeKalb County Official Site

Townships in DeKalb County, Illinois
1858 establishments in Illinois
Populated places established in 1858
Townships in Illinois